M-108 was a state trunkline highway in the US state of Michigan. The highway followed Nicolet Street, although some maps also labeled it as Mackinaw Highway. The road was on the boundary between Emmet and Cheboygan counties.

The original M-108 designation dated back to 1928. This version was transferred to local control in 1957, but revived later under a similar routing in 1960. On April 29, 2010, the Petoskey News-Review reported that the Michigan Department of Transportation (MDOT) would rebuild the roadway in preparation to transfer it back to local control once again. MDOT and local officials signed memoranda of understanding, completing the transfer of the roadway on December 9, 2010.

Route description

The  trunkline connected two interchanges off Interstate 75 (I-75) on the south side of Mackinaw City with a tourist welcome center. The southern terminus was at a partial interchange with I-75 (exit 337) just south of Mackinaw City on the boundary between Emmet and Cheboygan counties. M-108 followed Nicolet Street north from I-75 into the Village of Mackinaw City past the Thunder Falls Water Park and some local motels to an intersection with US 23. North of the US 23 intersection is the Michigan Welcome Center and other tourist amenities on the west side of the street. State maintenance ended at the intersection with the off-ramp from northbound I-75 exit 338.

History

In 1928, the first M-108 designation was commissioned along a rare three-legged route connecting the State Highway Ferry Docks with the Fort Michilimackinac State Historic Park and US 31. At one point while traveling westbound on M-108, motorists could turn right onto northbound M-108 or left onto southbound M-108. In preparation for the opening of the Mackinac Bridge, the Michigan State Highway Department transferred all of M-108 to local control in late 1957, decommissioning the designation at the same time. In 1960, the current M-108 was commissioned along the final routing.

On April 29, 2010, MDOT announced plans to transfer M-108 in its entirety to the Village of Mackinaw City and Emmet County. In preparation for this transfer, MDOT repaved, widened and reconstructed the roadway. While rebuilding the section of the highway between US 23 and the northern terminus, the welcome center was closed. Plans had this section to be completed, and the center to be reopened, for Memorial Day weekend, with the remainder of construction to be completed in August. Following the transfer to local control, M-108 ceased to be a state highway and the designation was decommissioned. Previous news reports stated that the roadway was too small to merit highway status under federal guidelines. The transfer was completed on December 9, 2010, when MDOT and local officials signed memoranda of understanding to finalize the transfer. The section within the Village of Mackinaw City was transferred to the village, and the remainder to Emmet County.

Major intersections
The entire highway was on the Emmet–Cheboygan county line.

See also

References

External links

Former M-108 at Michigan Highways
Map of M-108, 1928–52 at Michigan Highways

108
Transportation in Emmet County, Michigan
Transportation in Cheboygan County, Michigan